René Monory (6 June 1923 – 11 April 2009) was a French centre-right Gaullist politician.

Biography
René Monory was born in Loudun and began his career as the owner of a garage. He was the founder of the Poitiers Futuroscope.

Monory first became a Senator in 1968. A member of the Union for French Democracy (UDF), he was Minister of Economy and Finance (1978–1981) in the government of Raymond Barre. He was President of the Regional Council of Poitou-Charentes from March 1985 to March 1986. He later served as Minister of Education (1986–1988) in the government of Jacques Chirac. He succeeded Alain Poher as President of the Senate in 1992. 

He served as President of the Senate for two terms. He was defeated for re-election to the post on 1 October 1998, withdrawing after the first round of voting; Christian Poncelet was elected in the third round.

He died in Loudun, aged 85.

Political career
Governmental functions

Minister of Industry, Commerce and Handicrafts : 1977–1978
Minister of Economy : 1978–1981
Minister of National Education : 1986–1988

Electoral mandates

Senate of France

President of the Senate of France : 1992–1998. Reelected in 1995.
Senator of the Vienne (departement) : 1968–1977, 1981–1986, 1986–2004. Elected in 1968, reelected in 1977 (But he stays minister), 1986 (But he stays minister), 1995.

Regional Council

President of the Regional Council of Poitou-Charentes: 1985–1986.
Regional councillor of Poitou-Charentes: 1973–1989 (Resignation). Elected in 1986.

General Council

President of the General council of the Vienne: 1977–2004. Reelected in 1979, 1982, 1985, 1988, 1992, 1994, 1998, 2001.
General councillor of the Vienne: 1961–2004. Reelected in 1967, 1973, 1979, 1985, 1992, 1998.

Municipal Council

Mayor of Loudun: 1959–1999 (resignation). Reelected in 1965, 1971, 1977, 1983, 1989, 1995.
Municipal councillor of Loudun: 1959–1999 (resignation). Reelected in 1965, 1971, 1977, 1983, 1989, 1995.

Community of communes Council

President of the Communauté de communes of the Pays Loudunais: 1973–2002 (Resignation). Reelected in 1977, 1983, 1989, 1995, 2001.
Member of the Communauté de communes of the Pays Loudunais: 1973–2002 (Resignation). Reelected in 1977, 1983, 1989, 1995, 2001.

References

1923 births
2009 deaths
People from Loudun
French Senators of the Fifth Republic
Presidents of the Senate (France)
French Ministers of Commerce and Industry
French Ministers of National Education
French Ministers of Finance
Senators of Vienne
Politicians from Nouvelle-Aquitaine